Tamara Marthe (born 28 November 1985), better known as Shy'm , is a French singer. She released her first album, Mes fantaisies, in 2006 and has since released six more albums. She had three Platinum albums, including her number-one 2012 album, Caméléon. In 2012, 2013 and 2015 she received the NRJ Music Award for Francophone Female Artist of the Year.

Early life
Tamara Marthe was born on 28 November 1985 in Trappes (a suburb west of Paris), France to a Metropolitan French mother and a father from Martinique, in a family oriented to music and creative arts. A fan of Red Hot Chili Peppers and Beyoncé, she nevertheless grew up to the sound of zouk—a French Caribbean music genre—and R&B. From an early age, she became interested in dancing and singing. She began taking lessons in dancing and she earned the nickname "Spicy Tam" as a result of the effort she put in it.

In academics, she obtained a baccalaureat at the age of seventeen. Along with her studies, she had been making demo recordings of herself while avoiding public scrutiny. Later, she went to Paris, where she sent the recordings to record companies. It was at this time that Lebanese-Canadian rapper K.Maro discovered her. Marthe acquired the stage name Shy'm and began her journey to stardom. Her pseudonym is a portmanteau, derived from "shy" and "Martinique". She says she is shy, but much less so than before when the mere idea of being on stage paralysed her with fright. But her passion has allowed her to overcome her shyness and she now takes "pleasure in putting herself in the crowd".

Career 
Rapper K.Maro agreed to feature her in the song "Histoire de luv" from his album. The song was recorded in Montréal. After that, she released her own album, Mes fantaisies. It was written, composed and produced by K.Maro.
Shy'm explored various themes for the album, such as recurring love and intermarriage and its success. The first single, "Femme de couleur", peaked at number 5 on the French singles chart. In 2007, she made a guest appearance on the popular French game show, Fort Boyard.

Shy'm's musical style is a mix of pop and R&B. Her first album, Mes fantaisies, has a prominent R&B sound, with pop, soul and hip hop influences. Her second album, Reflets, has a pop and R&B sound, though it has dance-pop influences. Her third album, Prendre l'air, deviates towards a more synthpop-inspired sound, with her fourth album, Caméléon, having a deeper exploration of this sound through dance.

 winning Danse avec les stars

In 2011, Shy'm won the second season of Danse avec les stars – the French version of Dancing with the Stars. She was partnered with professional dancer Maxime Dereymez. On November 19, 2011, they won the competition. 

In 2012, she joined the Les Enfoirés charity ensemble.

Awards
2012 NRJ Music Awards – Francophone Female Artist of the Year
2013 NRJ Music Awards – Francophone Female Artist of the Year
2015 NRJ Music Awards – Francophone Female Artist of the Year

Discography

Mes Fantaisies (2006)
Reflets (2008)
Prendre l'air (2010)
Caméléon (2012)
Solitaire (2014)
À nos dix ans (2015)
H.E.R.O.S. (2017)
Agapé (2019)

Tours
Shimi Tour (2011–2013)
Paradoxale Tour (2015)
Concerts Exceptionnels (2018)
Agapé Tour (2019)

References

External links

  
 
 

1985 births
Living people
People from Trappes
French people of Martiniquais descent
French contemporary R&B singers
Black French musicians
Danse avec les stars winners
Warner Music France artists
21st-century French singers
21st-century French women singers